Witch house is a microgenre of electronic music characterized by dark occult themes and visual aesthetics that emerged in the late 2000s and early 2010s. The style is heavily influenced by chopped and screwed hip hop, as well as industrial music, ethereal wave and dream pop. Witch house incorporates synths, drum machines, obscure samples, droning repetition, and vocals that are heavily altered, ethereal, and/or indiscernible.

The witch house visual aesthetic includes occult, witchcraft, shamanism, terror and horror-inspired artworks, collages and photographs as well as significant use of hidden messages and typographic elements such as Unicode symbols. Artworks by witch house visual artists have incorporated imagery from horror films such as The Blair Witch Project, the television series Twin Peaks, horror-inspired dark web videos and mainstream pop culture celebrities of the 2000s. Common typographic elements in titles, such as by Salem and White Ring, include triangles, crosses and Unicode symbols, which are seen by some as a method of keeping the scene underground and harder to search for on the Internet, as well as references to the television series Twin Peaks and Charmed.

Influences and style 
Despite the name of the genre, witch house has little in common with house music, which generally features a strong up-tempo beat. Instead, witch house adapts techniques rooted in chopped and screwed hip-hop, specifically drastically slowed tempos with skipping, stop-timed beats—from artists such as DJ Screw, coupled with elements from other genres such as ethereal wave, noise, drone, cloud rap and shoegaze. Many artists in the genre have released slowed down and backmasked remixes of pop and hip hop songs, or long mixes of different songs that have been slowed down significantly. Witch house is also influenced by 1980s ethereal wave bands such as Cocteau Twins, as well as being heavily influenced by certain industrial and experimental bands, such as Psychic TV and Coil. The use of hip-hop drum machines, noise atmospherics, creepy samples, dark synthpop-influenced lead melodies, dense reverb, and heavily altered, distorted, and pitched down vocals are the primary attributes that characterize the genre's sound. The genre rose to prominence in the early 2010s with renewed interest in individually produced electronic music and Internet subcultures, rising with the increasing tide of genres such as seapunk and vaporwave.

Origins and etymology 
The term witch house was coined in 2009 by Travis Egedy, professionally known as Pictureplane. The term was originally conceived as a joke, as Egedy explained: "Myself and my friend Shams... were joking about the sort of house music we make, [calling it] witch house because it’s, like, occult-based house music. ...I did this best-of-the-year thing with Pitchfork about witch house.... I was saying that we were witch house bands, and 2010 was going to be the year of witch house.... It took off from there. ...But, at the time, when I said witch house, it didn’t even really exist..." Shortly after being mentioned to Pitchfork, blogs and other mainstream music press began to use the term. Flavorwire said that despite Egedy's insistence, "the genre does exist now, for better or worse".

Some music journalists, along with some members of musical acts identified as being in the genre's current movement, consider witch house to be a false label for a microgenre, constructed by certain publications in the music press (including The Guardian, Pitchfork and various music blogs). The genre was also briefly connected to the term rape gaze, the serious use of which was publicly denounced by its coiners, who never expected it to be used as an actual genre term, but viewed it as simply a joke intended to mock the music press' propensity towards the creation of microgenres.

References

Electronic music genres
Fusion music genres
Industrial music
Experimental music genres
Dark music genres
Microgenres
2000s neologisms
2010s in music
Indie music
2000s in music
21st-century music genres